Anthology is a 1990 compilation album by progressive bluegrass band New Grass Revival.

Track listing
 "Can't Stop Now" (Nicholson, Waldman) – 3:56
 "Ain't That Peculiar" (Moore, Robinson, Rogers) – 2:48
 "Angel Eyes" (Hiatt, Koller) – 4:29
 "Revival" (Rowan) – 3:51
 "Metric Lips" (Fleck) – 4:33
 "Reach" (Hall) – 3:56
 "You Plant Your Fields" (Lowery, Waldman) – 3:30
 "Callin' Baton Rouge" (Linde) – 2:38
 "Hold to a Dream" (O'Brien) – 3:38
 "Friday Night in America" (Flynn, Smith) – 3:52

Personnel
 John Cowan - bass guitar, vocals
 Béla Fleck - banjo, vocals
 Pat Flynn - guitar, vocals
 Sam Bush - fiddle, mandolin, guitar, vocals

References

New Grass Revival albums